André Harvey (born April 29, 1939) is a Canadian former politician, who served as a Quebec Liberal Party member of the National Assembly of Quebec from 1970 to 1976.

Born and raised in Jonquière, Quebec, he was educated at Université Laval. He worked as an announcer for CKRS and as a sportswriter for La Presse in the 1950s and 1960s before working in marketing for companies such as Domtar, Ganong Bros. and the Fédération des magasins Coop.

He was first elected to the legislature in the 1970 election, representing the electoral district of Chauveau. In the 1973 election, he shifted to the new electoral district of Charlesbourg, and was re-elected to a second term. However, he was defeated in the 1976 election by Denis de Belleval of the Parti Québécois.

He ran again in the 1981 election in the electoral district of Jonquière, but was not reelected.

His brother Gérald Harvey was also a member of the legislature, who represented Jonquière from 1966 to 1976.

References

External links
André Harvey

1939 births
Living people
Quebec Liberal Party MNAs
20th-century Canadian politicians
Politicians from Saguenay, Quebec
Politicians from Quebec City
French Quebecers